"Big Scary Animal" (titled "It's Too Real (Big Scary Animal)" in the United States) is a song written by American singer-songwriter Belinda Carlisle with Charlotte Caffey and Ralph Schuckett, and produced by Schuckett for Carlisle's fifth studio album, Real (1993). The song was released on September 13, 1993, as the album's lead single. The CD single includes two B-sides: "Windows of the World",  also from the Real album, and "Change", which is an eight-track demo. "Big Scary Animal" peaked at number 12 on the UK Singles Chart, reached number 26 in Iceland, and became a minor hit in Australia, Canada, and Germany.

Critical reception
Alan Jones from Music Week gave the song four out of five, writing, "Belinda's quirky upfront vocal style suits this acoustically jangling song which cames complete with appropriate jungle motifs via drums and sound effects. Tougher than a lot of her whimsical singles and a promising taster for her Real album."

Music video
There are three versions of the music video for "Big Scary Animal": the international UK video (directed by Michel Gondry), the director's cut, and US version (directed by Jim Gable).

Track listings
 US cassette single
 "It's Too Real (Big Scary Animal)" – 4:08
 "Windows of the World" – 3:26

 Non-US 7-inch and cassette single
 European CD single
 "Big Scary Animal"
 "Windows of the World"

 UK CD single
 "Big Scary Animal"
 "Windows of the World"
 "Change" (8 track demo)
 "Too Much Water" (8 track demo)

 European maxi-CD and Australian CD single
 "Big Scary Animal"
 "Windows of the World"
 "Change" (8 track demo)

Charts

References

1993 singles
1993 songs
Belinda Carlisle songs
Songs written by Belinda Carlisle
Songs written by Charlotte Caffey
Songs written by Ralph Schuckett
Virgin Records singles